Lo Que Te Conté Mientras Te Hacías La Dormida (Spanish for "What I Told You While You Were Pretending to Be Asleep"), is the third studio album of the Spanish pop rock band La Oreja de Van Gogh issued by Sony Music Entertainment in April 2003. In France, the album was released as Paris.

Internationally, it is the most successful album of the band. It received mixed reviews from critics and produced five Top 10 singles, including "Puedes contar conmigo", "Rosas" and "20 de enero", all of which reached the No.1 spot on the Spain chart.

Track listing

Personnel

Performing
 La Oreja de Van Gogh
 Amaia Montero – vocals, backing vocals
 Xabi San Martín – keyboards, backing vocals, programming
 Pablo Benegas – guitar
 Álvaro Fuentes – bass
 Haritz Garde – percussion, programming
 Pablo Villafranca – vocals

Technical
 Nigel Walker – record production, audio mixing
 Bori Alarcón – technical production
 Damian Schuler – sound recording
 Rubén Suárez – sound recording
 George Marino – audio mastering

Design
 Jaume de Laiguana – photography, graphic design

Singles
 2003 "Puedes contar conmigo"
 #1 Spain
 #5 US Latin Tracks
 2003 "20 de enero"
 #1 Spain
 2003 "Rosas"
 #1 Spain
 #4 US Latin Tracks
 2003 "Deseos de cosas imposibles"
 #4 Spain
 #21 US Latin Tracks
 2004 "Vestido azul"
 #1 Spain
 2004 "Geografía"
 #6 Spain
 2004 "Historia de un sueño"
 #15 Spain
 2004 "Bonustrack"
 #9 Spain

Other Notable Songs
 "La paz de tus ojos"
 #22 Spain

Chart Position and Sales

Album

Sales and certifications

Awards
 Ondas Award Best album of 2003 (Won)
 Amigo Award to the best Spanish band (Won)
 Grammy Award for Best Latin Pop Album (Nominated)

French Edition
On 10 May 2004 Sony Music issued a special edition of Lo que te conté mientras te hacías la dormida for the French market, befittingly titled Paris.  This edition includes tracks from La Oreja de Van Gogh's second studio album, El viaje de Copperpot.  The title track "Paris" features a partial French adaptation sung in duo with Belgian singer Pablo Villafranca.

See also
List of albums containing a hidden track

References

2003 albums
La Oreja de Van Gogh albums